Tomislav Stanić (born 30 May 1981) is a Bosnian-Herzegovinian retired footballer who last played for Malavan in the Iran Pro League.

Club career
Stanić previously played for Hajduk Split and NK Inter Zaprešić in the Croatian First League, making only a handful of substitute appearances over three seasons. He had a brief spell with Dynamo Dresden in the German 2. Bundesliga during the 2005-06 season where he scored 1 goal. He became the first foreign footballer to ever play for Malavan F.C. when he joined the club in 2008.

Azerbaijan career statistics

References

1981 births
Living people
Association football midfielders
Bosnia and Herzegovina footballers
HNK Hajduk Split players
NK Troglav 1918 Livno players
NK Inter Zaprešić players
Dynamo Dresden players
NK Lokomotiva Zagreb players
Diósgyőri VTK players
Shamakhi FK players
Malavan players
Croatian Football League players
2. Bundesliga players
Azerbaijan Premier League players
Persian Gulf Pro League players
Bosnia and Herzegovina expatriate footballers
Expatriate footballers in Croatia
Bosnia and Herzegovina expatriate sportspeople in Croatia
Expatriate footballers in Germany
Bosnia and Herzegovina expatriate sportspeople in Germany
Expatriate footballers in Hungary
Bosnia and Herzegovina expatriate sportspeople in Hungary
Expatriate footballers in Azerbaijan
Bosnia and Herzegovina expatriate sportspeople in Azerbaijan
Expatriate footballers in Iran
Bosnia and Herzegovina expatriate sportspeople in Iran
FK Genclerbirliyi Sumqayit players